James Francis Bellamy (11 September 1881 – 30 March 1969) was an English football player and manager who played as right half or outside right for a number of clubs in the Football League, including Woolwich Arsenal, Burnley and Fulham. He also played in Scotland, winning the Scottish Cup with Dundee in 1910.

Bellamy went on to coach in various European countries, such as Germany, Italy with Brescia Calcio, and Spain with FC Barcelona.

Early life
Bellamy was born in Bethnal Green, Middlesex, on 11 September 1881.

Playing career
Bellamy began his career in non-League football with Barking, Grays United and Reading. He then joined Woolwich Arsenal in May 1903, making his first team debut in 1905. Altogether he made a sum of twenty nine league appearances for the Gunners, scoring four times in all. He was transferred to Portsmouth in 1907, and also played for Norwich City before joining Dundee in May 1908. He was part of the Dundee team that won the 1910 Scottish Cup Final against Clyde. After a goalless draw, Bellamy scored Dundee's first goal as they won the replay 2–1.

Bellamy left Dundee in May 1912, when he was transferred to Motherwell. He returned to England shortly afterwards, joining Burnley in October 1912. He then signed for Fulham in July 1914.

Bellamy later played for Dundee Hibernian during the 1917–18 season, and also played for Southend United and Ebbw Vale before ending his career at Barking Town.

Management career
After retiring as a player, Bellamy began a coaching career in Europe. He had jobs in Germany and managed Brescia in the Italian Football Championship from 1926 to 1928 before going to Spain.

On 26 March 1929, Bellamy was appointed as the manager of Barcelona, succeeding Romà Forns. At the time he took up the position, Barcelona were placed eighth at five points off the top. Bellamy eventually took the club to their first ever La Liga title as they finished three points ahead of second placed Real Madrid. Bellamy's stay at Camp de Les Corts saw him lift a Catalan football championship title in 1929–30. During the 1930–31 season he led Barça to another Catalan championship, but was at the helm for the club's 12–1 record defeat to Athletic Bilbao in February 1931.

Returning to England, Bellamy was appointed coach of Barking Town in February 1933, but was dismissed three months later. He later claimed for wrongful dismissal, but lost in court.

After football
Bellamy died at Chadwell Heath, London, on 30 March 1969.

Honours

As a player
Dundee
 Scottish Cup: 1910
 Forfarshire Cup: 1909 & 1912

As manager
Barcelona
 Spanish La Liga: 1929
 Campeonato de Catalunya: 1929–30, 1930–31

Notes

References

1881 births
1969 deaths
Footballers from Bethnal Green
English footballers
Barking F.C. players
Grays United F.C. players
Reading F.C. players
Arsenal F.C. players
Portsmouth F.C. players
Norwich City F.C. players
Dundee F.C. players
Motherwell F.C. players
Burnley F.C. players
Fulham F.C. players
Dundee United F.C. players
Southend United F.C. players
Ebbw Vale F.C. players
English Football League players
Scottish Football League players
English football managers
English expatriate football managers
Brescia Calcio managers
FC Barcelona managers
Burnley F.C. wartime guest players
Expatriate football managers in Italy
Expatriate football managers in Spain
English expatriate sportspeople in Italy
English expatriate sportspeople in Spain
Association football outside forwards
Association football wing halves